is a Japanese politician of the New Komeito Party, a member of the House of Representatives in the Diet (national legislature). Saito is currently serving his fifth term in the Lower House by Chugoku proportional election and is the current Minister of Land, Infrastructure, Transport and Tourism.

Career
A native of Ōchi District, Shimane, he attended Tokyo Institute of Technology as an undergraduate studying applied physics, graduating in 1976, and received a Ph.D in engineering from the same school. His first employment was with the major construction firm Shimizu Corporation.  Saito was a visiting researcher at Princeton University for three years beginning in 1986.  He was elected to the Diet for the first time in 1993.

Saito is known for his ties with NASA as well as expert knowledge of lunar bases and clean energy technology.  Due to his knowledge in these areas, he was appointed parliamentary secretary of science and technology in 1999 in the Keizo Obuchi administration.

Saito was appointed as Minister of the Environment by Prime Minister Yasuo Fukuda on August 1, 2008. In the Cabinet of Prime Minister Taro Aso, appointed on September 24, 2008, Saito was retained in his post.

His main hobby is swimming.

References

External links 
 Official website in Japanese.

1952 births
Living people
People from Shimane Prefecture
Members of the House of Representatives (Japan)
Environment ministers of Japan
New Komeito politicians
Tokyo Institute of Technology alumni
21st-century Japanese politicians
Ministers of Land, Infrastructure, Transport and Tourism of Japan